Paul Hardiman is a British record producer. He worked with Lloyd Cole and the Commotions (on their debut Rattlesnakes) and Lloyd Cole's solo career. His other production credits include Chris de Burgh's most commercially successful albums Into the Light (including worldwide hit "The Lady in Red") and Flying Colours, as well as Soul Mining by the The.

References

External links 
 

British record producers
Living people
Year of birth missing (living people)
Place of birth missing (living people)